Suraj Mandal (born 02 February 1949) is an Indian politician and a member of the 10th Lok Sabha. Mandal was elected to the Lok Sabha, the lower house of the Parliament of India from Godda, Bihar in the 1991 Indian general election as a member of the Jharkhand Mukti Morcha by defeating a sitting member of Bharatiya Janata Party leader Janardan Yadav. Mandal was MLA in Bihar Vidhan Sabha from 1980 to 1991.

Mandal was named in the cash-for-vote controversy over a no-trust motion during P V Narasimha Rao’s tenure in 1993. He left Jharkhand Mukti Morcha in and formed Jharkhand Vikas Dal.

External links
 Official biographical sketch in Parliament of India website

References

1946 births
Living people
India MPs 1991–1996
Lok Sabha members from Bihar
Bharatiya Janata Party politicians from Bihar
Indian National Congress politicians from Bihar
Jharkhand Mukti Morcha politicians
People from Godda district